Prince Nikolaus August of Sweden and Norway, Duke of Dalarna (24 August 1831 – 4 March 1873) was the youngest of the five children of King Oscar I of Sweden and Josephine of Leuchtenberg.

Biography

Early life
Born in Drottningholm Palace in Ekerö, Stockholm County, his eldest sibling was King Carl XV of Sweden.

During parts of 1849–1853, he was a student at Uppsala University. On 10 December 1851, he was made an honorary member of the Royal Swedish Academy of Sciences.

Marriage
On 16 April 1864 in Altenburg, the Duke married Princess Therese Amalie of Saxe-Altenburg (Ansbach, 21 December 1836 - Haga Palace, Stockholm, 9 November 1914), Duchess of Saxony, eldest daughter of Prince Eduard of Saxe-Altenburg and his first wife Princess Amalie of Hohenzollern-Sigmaringen. The marriage did not produce issue. In Sweden, his wife was styled Princess Teresia.

The Prince was very interested in trains and locomotives, and a locomotive was named after him. Since it was commonly thought the Prince was not very bright, this led to the expression "dummare än tåget" (lit. "more stupid than the train"), an expression still in use in the Swedish language.

Prince August died at the age of 41 of pneumonia at the Stockholm Palace, Stockholm.

Honours and arms

Honours 
He received the following orders and decorations:

Arms

Ancestry

References

People from Ekerö Municipality
House of Bernadotte
Norwegian princes
Swedish princes
Dukes of Dalarna
Swedish people of French descent
Uppsala University alumni
Members of the Royal Swedish Academy of Sciences
1831 births
1873 deaths
Burials at Riddarholmen Church
Deaths from pneumonia in Sweden
Knights of the Order of Charles XIII
Commanders Grand Cross of the Order of the Sword
Commanders Grand Cross of the Order of the Polar Star
Grand Crosses of the Order of Saint Stephen of Hungary
Recipients of the Order of the Netherlands Lion
Recipients of the Order of the White Eagle (Russia)
Recipients of the Order of St. Anna, 1st class
Sons of kings